The term Holocaust museum may refer to:

Adelaide Holocaust Museum and Andrew Steiner Education Centre, Adelaide, South Australia
Ani Ma'amin Holocaust Museum, Jerusalem
Dallas Holocaust Museum/Center for Education & Tolerance, Dallas, Texas, US
Florida Holocaust Museum, St Petersburg, Florida, US
Ghetto Fighters' House, Western Galilee, Israel
Holocaust Memorial Center, Farmington Hills, Michigan, US
 Holocaust Memorial Center for the Jews of Macedonia, Skopje, North Macedonia
Holocaust Museum Houston, Houston, Texas, US
Illinois Holocaust Museum and Education Center, Skokie, Illinois, US
Jewish Holocaust Centre, Melbourne, Australia
Los Angeles Museum of the Holocaust, Los Angeles, US
Montreal Holocaust Memorial Centre, Montreal, Canada
Simon Wiesenthal Center, Los Angeles, US
Sydney Jewish Museum, Sydney, Australia
United States Holocaust Memorial Museum, Washington, D.C., US
Virginia Holocaust Museum, Richmond, Virginia, US
Yad Vashem, Jerusalem

See also
 Jewish Museum, Berlin
 List of Holocaust memorials and museums
 America's Black Holocaust Museum